Robert Page may refer to:

Politicians
Robert Page (Virginia politician) (1765–1840), American politician, U.S. Representative from Virginia
Robert N. Page (1859–1933), US Congressman from North Carolina
Robert J. S. Page, mayor of Flint, Michigan, 1856–1857
Robert Page (MP), Member of Parliament for Old Sarum

Sports
Rob Page (born 1974), Welsh international footballer
Robert Page (rower) (1936–1991), former New Zealand rower

Others
Robert E. Page Jr. (born 1949), American honey bee geneticist
Robert Morris Page (1903–1992), American physicist; leading figure in the development of radar
Robert W. Page (born 1927), Assistant Secretary of the Army (Civil Works)
Robert Page (soldier) (1920–1945), Australian soldier
Robert Owen Page (1897–1957), New Zealand pacifist and industrial chemist

See also
Bob Page (disambiguation)